Attila Balázs was the defending champion but decided not to participate.
Carlos Berlocq won the tournament against Adrian Ungur 6–1, 6–1 in the final. The final was played on Monday, 10 October 2011 due to bad weather conditions.

Seeds

Draw

Finals

Top half

Bottom half

References
 Main Draw
 Qualifying Draw

Sicilia Classic - Singles
Sicilia Classic